Chicago Tech Academy  (Chicago Tech) is a high school in the Chicago University Village in Pilsen. Chicago Tech Opened in September 2009 as the city's first technology high school. After being open for 5 years, the school was partnered with High Tech High in an attempt to stay open. With the partnership, they received a new principal and school support system, and transitioned to project-based learning.

Chicago Tech Academy has transformed teaching and learning by focusing on professional development and professional learning communities.

http://gettingsmart.com/2016/04/transforming-schools-through-strengths-based-pd/

References

External links 
 Chicago Technology Academy website

Public high schools in Chicago